Ernest Billiet (1 July 1873 – 21 March 1939) was a French politician. He served as a member of the French Senate from 1920 to 1927.

References

1873 births
1939 deaths
French Senators of the Third Republic
Senators of Seine (department)